Alok Sarin is a psychiatrist and mental health activist based in New Delhi, India. He is a consultant psychiatrist at Sitaram Bharatia Institute of Science and Research, New Delhi.
He has been a Senior Fellow at the Nehru Memorial Museum and Library, Teen Murti House, New Delhi, and has been a member of the Task Force, set up by the Ministry of Health and Family Welfare, Government of India, to write a mental health policy for India.

References

External links
 ResearchGate profile of Alok Sarin

Indian psychiatrists
Mental health activists
Living people
Year of birth missing (living people)